Paralaubuca typus is a species of freshwater ray-finned fish from the carp and minnow family Cyprinidae from south-east Asia. It is found in Thailand in the basins of the Chao Phraya, Tapi, Mekong and Mae Klong and in the Mekong on Laos and Cambodia, as well as Vietnam where it is also found in the La Ngà River. It is one of the most abundant fish species in the lower Mekong.

Paralaubuca typus occurs in the shallower parts of large rivers where it forms schools and it is often harvested in large numbers. When water levels are high it enters flooded forests returning to the rivers when they fall. Spawning coincides with the start of the seasonal floods in May to July and the eggs and larvae are swept by the currents downstream and into the inundated areas. It is a long distance migrant, moving out of Tonle Sap upstream in the Mekong between November–February. It feeds on zooplankton and occasionally on insects.

It is a target species for both commercial and subsistence fisheries. It is sometimes sold as fresh fish but it is more often dried or used to make a fermented fish sauce. Deforestation, water pollution, dams and water abstraction are threats to this species.

References

Fish described in 1864
Taxa named by Pieter Bleeker
Fish of Thailand
Cyprinid fish of Asia
Paralaubuca